Samedan Airport , also known as Engadin Airport, is a regional airport in Samedan in the Engadin valley of Switzerland, 5 km from St. Moritz.

History
At the end of World War II, Swiss authorities identified existing locations that were to be modernized with new regional airports, as second tiers of infrastructure to support the primary urban airports, with Samedan being one of the five.

Facilities
The airport has one runway designated 03/21 with an asphalt pavement measuring 1800 x 40 metres (5905 x 130 ft). Because of its location at the bottom of a valley, it is not equipped with an instrument landing system.

Operations
At an elevation of 1,707 metres (5,600 ft), it is the second highest airliner airport in Europe (with Courchevel being the highest). It is also considered one of the most challenging airports in the world because of its difficult topography and winds, and because of the thinness of the air at its altitude. The airport does not have any scheduled passenger flights (the nearest such airports are Lugano, 185 km/115 mi Milan Malpensa/Milan, 180km/112mi, and Zürich, 220 km/135 mi distance by road). Much of its traffic consists of light to heavy general aviation traffic, including many private-corporate jets, private propeller aircraft, and the fleet of Swiss Jet. One of the biggest planes seen there, more often than not, is the HK Co.'s 737-200 or the A320
. The takeoff generally requires the spooling up of engines, with brakes on, to minimize the time on the runway while maximizing as much speed possible. This technique is generally performed by bigger aircraft, with heavier payload.

See also
 Transport in Switzerland

References

Notes

External links
 
 
 
 

Airports in Switzerland
Engadin
Samedan